is a town located on Tokunoshima, in Ōshima District, Kagoshima Prefecture, Japan.

As of June 2013, the town has an estimated population of 6,350 and a population density of 79 persons per km². The total area is 80.35  km². The economy of the town is based on sugar cane, beef and seasonal tourism.

Geography
Amagi occupies the northeastern portion of the island of Tokunoshima, with the East China Sea to the west.

Surrounding municipalities
Tokunoshima
Isen

Climate
The climate is classified as humid subtropical (Köppen climate classification Cfa) with very warm summers and mild winters. Precipitation is high throughout the year, but is highest in the months of May, June and September.

History

Invasion of Ryukyu 
During the Invasion of Ryukyu, a fleet of the Satsuma Domain landed at Amagi on April 17, 1609. The ships were besieged all night by locals until the next day, when troops fired into the crowds after being disembarked. A total of 50 people were killed.

Modern History 
Amagi Village was established on April 1, 1908. As with all of Tokunoshima, the village came under the administration of the United States from 1 July 1946 to 25 December 1953.  On 1 January 1961, Amagi was upgraded to town status.

Transport

Ports
Hetono Port

Airport
Tokunoshima Airport

Noted people from Amagi
Kyokunankai Hiromitsu

References

External links

Town website in Japanese] 

Towns in Kagoshima Prefecture
Populated coastal places in Japan